Sam or Samuel Hawkins may refer to:

Samuel Hawkins (politician), member of the 34th New York State Legislature
Sam Hawkins (baseball), American baseball player
Samuel David Hawkins (born 1933), American defector to China
Samuel Hawkins (Jericho), fictional character
Sam Hawkins (fictional detective), protagonist of Sam Hawkins, Pirate Detective